Shimada (written:  or  lit. "island rice field") is a Japanese surname. Notable people with the surname include:

Bell M. Shimada (1922–1958), American fisheries scientist
Bin Shimada (born 1954), voice actor
Fumikane Shimada (born 1974), an anime and video game illustrator and character designer
, Japanese idol, singer and actress
Ichirō Shimada, samurai
Izumi Shimada, anthropologist
Kosaku Shimada, golfer
Kaho Shimada, singer
Masahiko Shimada, writer
Michiru Shimada, anime screenwriter
, 18th-century Japanese botanical illustrator
, Japanese fencer
, Japanese handball player
, Japanese swimmer
, Japanese ice hockey player
Shigetarō Shimada, admiral
Shinsuke Shimada, former TV host
Shogo Shimada (disambiguation), the name of several people
Shusuke Shimada, footballer
Tadashi Shimada, photographer
Soji Shimada, mystery novelist
Takahiro Shimada, footballer
Takashi Shimada, manga writer see Yudetamago
Teru Shimada, actor
Thomas Shimada, tennis player
Shimada Toranosuke (1810–1864), Japanese samurai
Toshio Shimada, politician, cabinet minister
Toshiyuki Shimada, conductor
Yoko Shimada (1953–2022), actress
Yuji Shimada, MMA referee
Yuki Shimada, footballer
Yusuke Shimada, footballer

Fictional characters
Shimada Kambei, one of the fictional Seven Samurai
Haruo Shimada, from Dai Sentai Goggle-V
Genji Shimada, a cybernetic samurai from the video game Overwatch
Hanzo Shimada, the brother of Genji Shimada and skilled archer, from the video game Overwatch
Norimichi Shimada, character from Fireworks, Should We See It from the Side or the Bottom?
 Alice Shimada, a character from Girls und Panzer
 Chiyo Shimada, mother of Alice Shimada from Girls und Panzer

Japanese-language surnames